Marcos Justine Fernández was a Panamanian military officer who was the last Chief of the general staff of the Panama Defense Forces under dictator Manuel Noriega before its dismantling following the United States invasion of Panama in 1989.

Before his time in the Defense Forces, he was the head of National Police of Panama City and head of the Veraguas police zone.

Following the invasion Justine was arrested and accused of embezzling $20 million dollars from the National Bank of Panama during the dictatorship. He received a presidential pardon in 1996 and was released.

He suffered pneumonia and died on 6 June 2017 aged 83 at the Hospital Nacional in Panama City.

References

1930s births
2017 deaths
Year of birth uncertain
Panamanian politicians
People from Panama City
Panamanian military commanders